The Window Cleaner is a 1968 British sex comedy short film directed by Malcolm Leigh and starring Donald Sumpter, Edina Ronay, and Ann Lancaster.

References

External links
 
The Window Cleaner at BFI

1968 films
British short films
British sex comedy films
1968 short films
1960s sex comedy films
1968 comedy films
1960s English-language films
1960s British films